Raymundo Quitoriano (born 28 February 1933) is a Filipino former sports shooter. He competed in the skeet event at the 1972 Summer Olympics.

References

External links
 

1933 births
Living people
Filipino male sport shooters
Olympic shooters of the Philippines
Shooters at the 1966 Asian Games
Shooters at the 1972 Summer Olympics
Asian Games medalists in shooting
Place of birth missing (living people)
Asian Games silver medalists for the Philippines
Medalists at the 1966 Asian Games
20th-century Filipino people